Events from the year 1931 in Michigan.

Office holders

State office holders

 Governor of Michigan: Wilber M. Brucker (Republican)
 Lieutenant Governor of Michigan: Luren D. Dickinson (Republican)
 Michigan Attorney General: Paul W. Voorhies (Republican)
 Michigan Secretary of State: Frank D. Fitzgerald (Republican)
 Speaker of the Michigan House of Representatives: Fred R. Ming (Republican)
 Chief Justice, Michigan Supreme Court:

Mayors of major cities

 Mayor of Detroit: Frank Murphy (Democrat)
 Mayor of Grand Rapids: John D. Karel
 Mayor of Flint: William H. McKeighan
 Mayor of Lansing: Peter F. Gray
 Mayor of Ann Arbor: Edward W. Staebler/H. Wirt Newkirk

Federal office holders

 U.S. Senator from Michigan: James J. Couzens (Republican)
 U.S. Senator from Michigan: Arthur Vandenberg (Republican) 
 House District 1: Robert H. Clancy (Democrat)
 House District 2: Earl C. Michener (Republican)
 House District 3: Joseph L. Hooper (Republican)
 House District 4: John C. Ketcham (Republican)
 House District 5: Carl E. Mapes (Republican)
 House District 6: Grant M. Hudson (Republican)/Seymour H. Person (Republican)
 House District 7: Louis C. Cramton (Republican)/Jesse P. Wolcott (Republican)
 House District 8: Bird J. Vincent (Republican)/Michael J. Hart (Democrat)
 House District 9: James C. McLaughlin (Republican)
 House District 10: Roy O. Woodruff (Republican)
 House District 11: Frank P. Bohn (Democrat)
 House District 12: W. Frank James (Republican)
 House District 13: Clarence J. McLeod (Republican)

Population

Sports

Baseball

 1931 Detroit Tigers season – Under manager Bucky Harris, the Tigers compiled a 61-93 record and finished in seventh place in the American League. The team's statistical leaders included John Stone with a .327 batting average and 10 home runs, Dale Alexander with 87 RBIs, Earl Whitehill and Vic Sorrell with 13 wins each, and George Uhle with a 3.50 earned run average.
 1931 Michigan Wolverines baseball season - Under head coach Ray Fisher, the Wolverines compiled a 14–9–1 record. Jack Tompkins was the team captain.

American football 

 1931 Michigan Wolverines football team – Under head coach Harry Kipke, the Wolverines compiled an 8–1–1 record and tied for the Big Ten Conference championship. Bill Hewitt was selected as the team's most valuable player. 
 1931 Detroit Titans football team – The Titans compiled a 7–2–1 record under head coach Gus Dorais.
 1931 Michigan State Spartans football team – Under head coach Jim Crowley, the Spartans compiled a 5–3–1 record.
 1931 Western State Hilltoppers football team - Under head coach Mike Gary, the Hilltoppers compiled a 5–2 record.
 1931 Michigan State Normal Hurons football team - Under head coach Elton Rynearson, the Hurons compiled a 3–2–1 record.
 1931 Central State Bearcats football team - Under head coach George Van Bibber the Bercats compiled a 4–3 record.
 1931 City College of Detroit football team – The City College of Detroit (later known as Wayne State University compiled a 0–6–1 record under head coach Norman G. Wann.

Basketball

 1930–31 Michigan State Spartans men's basketball team – Under head coach Benjamin Van Alstyne, the Spartans compiled a 16–1 record.
 1930–31 Western Michigan Broncos men's basketball team – Under head coach Buck Read, the Broncos compiled a 14–3 record.
 1930–31 Michigan Wolverines men's basketball team – Under head coach Franklin Cappon, the Wolverines compiled a 13–4 record. 
 1930–31 City College of Detroit (CCD) men's basketball team – Under coach Newman Ertell, CCD (later known as Wayne State) compiled an 11–8 record.
 1930–31 Detroit Titans men's basketball team – Under head coach Lloyd Brazil, the Titans compiled a 10–9 record.

Ice hockey
 1930–31 Detroit Falcons season – Under coach Jack Adams, the Falcons compiled a 16–21–7 record and finished in fourth place in the National Hockey League (NHL) American Division. Ebbie Goodfellow led the team with 25 goals, 23 assists, and 48 points. Dolly Dolson was the team's goaltender. 
 1930–31 Michigan Wolverines men's ice hockey team – Under head coach Ed Lowrey, the Wolverines compiled a 10–5–2 record.
 1930–31 Michigan Tech Huskies men's ice hockey team – Under head coach Bert Noblet, the Huskies compiled a 2–7 record.

Other
 Port Huron to Mackinac Boat Race – 
 Michigan Open -

Chronology of events

January

February

March

April

May

June

July

August

September
 September 16 - Collingwood Manor Massacre

October

November

December

Births
 March 9 - Sam Williams, NFL defensive lineman (1959-1967), in Dansville, Michigan
 March 25 - Roger Zatkoff, NFL player (1953-1958), in Hamtramck, Michigan
 June 20 - James Tolkan, actor (Back to the Future trilogy, WarGames, Top Gun), in Calumet, Michigan
 July 16 - Mighty Igor, professional wrestler billed as the "World's Strongest Wrestler", in Dearborn, Michigan
 July 21 - J. Bob Traxler, U.S. Congressman (1974-1993), in Kawkawlin, Michigan
 July 26 - William L. Rowe, philosopher of religion, in Detroit
 August 26 - Guy Vander Jagt, U.S. Congressman (1966-1993), in Cadillac, Michigan
 September 6 - Sander Levin, U.S. Congressman (1983-2013), in Detroit
 October 22 - Ann Rule, true crime author (The Stranger Beside Me), in Lowell, Michigan
 December 7 - Billy Wells, NFL/AFL halfback (1954-1960), in Menominee, Michigan

Gallery of 1931 births

Deaths
 June 13 - Samuel William Smith, U.S. Congressman (1897-1915), at age 78 in Detroit
 July 18 - Bird J. Vincent, U.S. Congressman (1923-1931), at age 51 aboard a ship in the Pacific Ocean
 October 6 - Albert M. Todd, founder of the A.M. Todd Company, a world leader in the production of peppermint oil and other botanical extracts, at age 81 in Kalamazoo, Michigan
 November 26 - Edmond H. Barmore, the first University of Michigan quarterback, at age 71 in Los Angeles

Gallery of 1931 deaths

See also
 History of Michigan
 History of Detroit

References